McDonald Bay is an open bay in the Davis Sea,  wide at its entrance between Adams Island and the Haswell Islands, lying immediately west of Mabus Point on the coast of Antarctica.

See also
Lednikov Bay

References

Bays of Queen Mary Land